Port Macquarie is an electoral district of the Legislative Assembly in the Australian state of New South Wales. It is represented by Leslie Williams of the Liberal Party.

It presently includes parts of coastal Port Macquarie-Hastings City Council (including Port Macquarie, Dunbogan, Bonny Hills, Kendall, Kew, Laurieton, North Haven and West Haven) and the northeast of the Mid-Coast Council (including Coopernook, Lansdowne, Moorland, Hannam Vale, Johns River and Stewarts River). Since 1991, the district also includes Lord Howe Island.

History
Port Macquarie was created in 1988, replacing Oxley (which was recreated in 1991). It has historically been a comfortably safe seat for the National Party and has remained a centre-right seat for its entire existence. Dating to its time as Oxley, the Port Macquarie area had been held by a conservative party since the return to single-member seats in 1927, and had been in National hands for all but six years since 1945.

This tradition was broken in 2002, when three-term National member and shadow minister Rob Oakeshott resigned from the party to become an independent. He was handily reelected as an independent in 2003 and 2007. In 2003, he was returned with 82 percent of the two-party vote, making Port Macquarie the safest seat in the legislature.

Oakeshott resigned in 2008 to run in a by-election for the federal seat of Lyne, which was based on Port Macquarie at the time. He was succeeded by longtime friend and staffer Peter Besseling.

However, Besseling was swept out by the Nationals' Leslie Williams at the 2011 state election amid the massive National wave that swept through rural NSW that year. This was due in part to voter anger at Oakeshott's support for the minority federal Labor government. Despite Oakeshott's personal popularity, the Port Macquarie area was still National heartland. "Traditional" two-party matchups between the Nationals and Labor during Oakeshott and Besseling's tenures had always shown Port Macquarie as a comfortably safe National seat.

Proving this, Williams easily retained Port Macquarie in 2015. Despite suffering a 9.8 percent swing against Labor, she still sits on a majority of 19 percent, making Port Macquarie the sixth-safest National seat and the 17th-safest Coalition seat.

In 2020 Williams defected to the Liberals whilst still member for Port Macquarie making it the first time the seat has been held by a Liberal.

It marks the second time, after Oakeshott, that a member for Port Macquarie has quit the Nationals whilst holding the seat.

Prior to Williams' defection to the Liberals, the Liberal Party had never contested Port Macquarie.

As part of the redistribution of electoral districts for the 2023 state election, a proposal was received to move Lord Howe Island back into the electorate of Sydney. However, the NSW Electoral Commission eventually decided to retain the island within the electorate of Port Macquarie, where it has been included since 1991.

Members for Port Macquarie

Election results

References

Port Macquarie
Port Macquarie
1988 establishments in Australia
Mid North Coast